Maude Andrews Ohl (pen names, Annulet Andrews; December 29, 1862 – January 7, 1943) was an American journalist, poet, and novelist. She was The Atlanta Constitution's (since, The Atlanta Journal-Constitution) first woman reporter. Her published works include a biography about James Abbott McNeill Whistler, Cousin Butterfly: Being Some Memories of Whistler (1904); the novels The Wife of Narcissus (1908), and Melissa Starke (1935); as well as poetry collection Songs of Day and Night.

Early life and education
Maude Annulet Andrews was born in Taliaferro County, Georgia, December 29, 1862, in the home of her great-grandfather, Joshua Morgan. In infancy she went with her parents to Washington, Georgia, where she spent the years of her childhood in the home of her grandfather, Judge Garnett Andrews, one of the most distinguished jurists in the state. It was a sprawling estate with old orchards and terraced gardens, surrounded by a forest of giant trees. Ohl's father was Dr. Henry Andrews. Her cousins included Fanny Andrews, a popular novelist, and Eliza A. Bowen, the astronomer. Ohl was also related to General Robert Toombs.

Ohl received a liberal education and early showed her bent towards literature.

As a mere child, Ohl began writing poetry, much of which was printed.

Career
She became a contributor to the comic papers and magazines, and in 1889, as a result of some clever letters sent by her from New York City to The Atlanta Constitution, which at once developed a reputation as a promising young writer. Her work has included society sketches, art and dramatic criticism, and essays on social subjects, reforms, and public charities.

At an early age, she met Josiah Kingsley Ohl (1863-1920) at the Constitution, and by the time they married, in 1889, he was city editor and she was society editor. She continued using her maiden name, "Maude Andrews", while at the Constitution.

Ohl published poems in the Magazine of Poetry and in various journals. Her poems were widely copied. She also wrote for Puck, Cosmopolitan, and for Harper's Weekly. Under the pen name, "Annulet Andrews", she was the author of an autobiographical novel, Melissa Starke, published shortly before her 73rd birthday, and The Wife of Narcissus, a novel which ran serially in The Saturday Evening Post. As a critic, she was outspoken and appreciative. She discussed art and the drama with ability, and her society sketches were equally characterized by novelty and vigorous treatment. She wrote on all social matters, reforms, public charities, entertainments, with excellence.

Ohl was one of the Lady Managers of the Cotton States and International Exposition (1896). She served as president of the press committee, and provided services for the Woman's Department.

Ohl accompanied her husband to China when the latter was sent to the Orient as the Far Eastern Correspondent for the New York Herald. They returned to the U.S. in the early 1900s, when her Josiah was named editor of the Herald, and she then wrote a number of articles on her life in China.

While in Paris, and later in London, she contributed to various foreign periodicals. By 1906, she was residing in New York, contributing to syndicates and magazines, among them Lippincott's and Everybody's, while continuing to contribute weekly articles for the Constitution.

In 1891, along with Lollie Belle Wylie and others, she co-founded the Georgia Women's Press Club.

Personal life
The couple had one daughter, Joan, and made their home in Atlanta, Georgia. Following a short illness, Ohl died at her home in the Gramatan Hotel, Bronxville, New York, January 7, 1943.

Selected works
 Cousin Butterfly: Being Some Memories of Whistler (1904)
 The Wife of Narcissus (1908)
 Melissa Starke (1935)
 ''Songs of Day and Night'

References

Attribution

External links
 

1862 births
1943 deaths
19th-century American journalists
19th-century American women writers
20th-century American novelists
American women novelists
20th-century American women writers
American women journalists
The Atlanta Journal-Constitution people
19th-century American poets
20th-century American poets
American women poets
People from Taliaferro County, Georgia
Journalists from Georgia (U.S. state)
Novelists from Georgia (U.S. state)
Poets from Georgia (U.S. state)
Wikipedia articles incorporating text from A Woman of the Century